Alan Dupree Wheat (born October 16, 1951) is an American economist, lobbyist, and politician who served six terms in the  U.S. House of Representatives from the state of Missouri from 1983 to 1995.

Early life

His father was James Wheat, an officer and civil engineer in the U.S. Air Force. His mother Emogene (Jean) Wheat was a teacher. Since his father served in the USAF, he grew up in air bases and went to schools in Wichita, Kansas, and Seville in Spain. In 1968, he graduated from Airline High School in Bossier City, Louisiana. Wheat was hired by the Department of Housing and Urban Development as an economist in 1972 after passing his B.A. in economics at Grinnell College, in Iowa. Between 1973 and 1975 he joined the Mid–America Regional Council in Kansas City for the same role. In 1975 he then became an aide to Mike White a Jackson County, Missouri, executive.

Missouri legislature 
In 1976, he won the election at age 25 to the Missouri general assembly, at the age of 25 and stayed there until 1982.

Campaign for Congress 
When Congressman Richard Walker Bolling had to retire after the 1982 House of Representative election, Wheat won the Democratic primary by only 1,004 votes (11%). He went on to win the general election to succeed Bolling by beating Republican John Sharp with 58% of the votes.

House career and Senate campaign

Wheat was the youngest member of the United States House of Representatives ever to be appointed to the Rules Committee, and was also the first African-American to represent a district with a non-liberal white majority.  He was also a member of the United States House Select Committee on Children, Youth, and Families

In 1992, Wheat drew four opponents in the Democratic primary election. He was perceived to be vulnerable due to the House banking scandal and his having been one of the House members who had made overdrafts. Wheat survived the primary and defeated Republican Edward “Gomer” Moody, who was a well-known Missouri businessman. Wheat won the general election, which also included two third-party candidates, with 59% of the vote.

After United States Senator John Danforth said he would not run for re-election in the 1994 election, Wheat chose to leave the House and instead run for Danforth's seat. The Senate race was closely watched nationally because Wheat was perceived as a candidate who could win crossover votes, as the House district he represented was 70 percent white. Wheat lost the general election to former governor John Ashcroft. Karen McCarthy was elected to succeed him in the House.

Post-congressional career

After his Senate race, Wheat was chosen as vice president of Public Policy and Government Relations at CARE. He served as deputy campaign manager and director of constituent outreach of President Bill Clinton's re-election campaign in 1996. In 1997, Wheat formed the lobbying group Wheat Government Relations

Wheat joined the national law firm and lobbying practice Polsinelli in 2013, as the firm's Public Policy practice chair. He is currently a consultant with a subsidiary of the firm, Polsinelli Health Solutions, where he lobbies on behalf of health care clients at both the federal and state level of government.

Wheat currently serves on the board of directors at CARE.

Personal life 
Wheat has three children.

See also
List of African-American United States representatives

References

External links

Official Site: Wheat Government Relations
U.S. Senate Office of Public Records: Lobbyist Registration
Center for Public Integrity: LobbyWatch, Wheat Government Relations
 

|-

|-

|-

1951 births
African-American members of the United States House of Representatives
African-American state legislators in Missouri
Airline High School alumni
American lobbyists
Democratic Party members of the United States House of Representatives from Missouri
Grinnell College alumni
Living people
Democratic Party members of the Missouri House of Representatives
Politicians from San Antonio
Politicians from Kansas City, Missouri
21st-century African-American people
20th-century African-American people
Members of Congress who became lobbyists